The Dinosaur Park Formation is the uppermost member of the Belly River Group (also known as the Judith River Group), a major geologic unit in southern Alberta. It was deposited during the Campanian stage of the Late Cretaceous, between about 76.5 and 74.4 million years ago. It was deposited in alluvial and coastal plain environments, and it is bounded by the nonmarine Oldman Formation below it and the marine Bearpaw Formation above it.

The Dinosaur Park Formation contains dense concentrations of dinosaur skeletons, both articulated and disarticulated, which are often found with preserved remains of soft tissues. Remains of other animals such as fish, turtles, and crocodilians, as well as plant remains, are also abundant. The formation has been named after Dinosaur Provincial Park, a UNESCO World Heritage Site where the formation is well exposed in the badlands that flank the Red Deer River.

Geological setting 

The Dinosaur Park Formation is composed of sediments that were derived from the erosion of the mountains to the west. It was deposited on an alluvial to coastal plain by river systems that flowed eastward and southeastward to the Bearpaw Sea, a large inland sea that was part of the Western Interior Seaway.  That sea gradually inundated the adjacent coastal plain, depositing the marine shales of the Bearpaw Formation on top of the Dinosaur Park Formation.

The lower portion of the formation was laid down in fluvial channel environments and consists primarily of fine- to medium-grained, crossbedded sandstones. The upper portion, which was deposited in overbank and floodplain environments, consists primarily of massive to laminated, organic-rich mudstones with abundant root traces, and thin beds of bentonite. The Lethbridge Coal Zone, which consists of several seams of low-rank coal interbedded with mudstones and siltstones, marks the top of the formation.

The sediments of the Dinosaur Park Formation are similar to those of the underlying Oldman Formation and they were originally included in that formation. The two formations are separated by a regional disconformity, however, and are distinguished by petrographic and sedimentologic differences. In addition, articulated skeletal remains and bonebeds are rare in the Oldman Formation but abundant in the Dinosaur Park Formation.

Biostratigraphy 
The Dinosaur Park Formation can be divided into at least two distinct faunas. The lower part of the formation is characterized by the abundance of Corythosaurus and Centrosaurus. This group of species is replaced higher in the formation by a different ornithischian fauna characterized by the presence of Lambeosaurus and Styracosaurus. The appearance of several new, rare species of ornithischian at the very top of the formation may indicate that a third distinct fauna had replaced the second during the transition into younger, non-Dinosaur Park sediments, at the same time an inland sea transgresses onto land, but there are fewer remains here.  An unnamed pachyrhinosaur, Vagaceratops irvinensis, and Lambeosaurus magnicristatus may be more common in this third fauna.

The timeline below follows a synthesis presented by Fowler (2017) with additional information from Arbour et al. 2009, Evans et al. 2009, and Penkalski, 2013. Megaherbivore Assemblage Zones (MAZ) follow data presented by Mallon et al., 2012.

Amphibians 
Remains of the following amphibians have been found in the formation:

Albanerpetontidae (extinct, salamander-like amphibians)
Albanerpeton gracilis
Caudata (salamanders)
Habrosaurus prodilatus
Lisserpeton
Opisthotriton kayi
Scapherpeton tectum
unnamed caudatan
Two indeterminate caudatans
Salienta (frogs)
Two unnamed salientans
Tyrrellbatrachus brinkmani
Hensonbatrachus kermiti

Dinosaurs 
Remains of the following dinosaurs have been found in the formation:

Ornithischians 
Remains of the following ornithischians have been found in the formation:

Ankylosaurs

Ceratopsians 
An unnamed Pachyrhinosaurus-like taxon has been recovered from the formation.

Ornithopods 
At least one indeterminate thescelosaurid specimen has been recovered from the formation.

In a 2001 review of hadrosaur eggshell and hatchling material from the Dinosaur Park Formation, Darren H. Tanke and M. K. Brett-Surman concluded that hadrosaurs nested in both the ancient upland and lowlands of the formation's depositional environment.
The upland nesting grounds may have been preferred by the less common hadrosaurs, like Brachylophosaurus or Parasaurolophus. However, the authors were unable to determine what specific factors shaped nesting ground choice in the formation's hadrosaurs. They suggested that behavior, diet, soil condition, and competition between dinosaur species all potentially influenced where hadrosaurs nested.

Sub-centimeter fragments of pebbly-textured hadrosaur eggshell have been reported from the Dinosaur Park Formation. This eggshell is similar to the hadrosaur eggshell of Devil's Coulee in southern Alberta as well as that of the Two Medicine and Judith River Formations in Montana, United States. While present, dinosaur eggshell is very rare in the Dinosaur Park Formation and is only found in two different microfossil sites. These sites are distinguished by large numbers of pisidiid clams and other less common shelled invertebrates like unionid clams and snails. This association is not a coincidence as the invertebrate shells would have slowly dissolved and released enough basic calcium carbonate to protect the eggshells from naturally occurring acids that otherwise would have dissolved them and prevented fossilization.

In contrast with eggshell fossils, the remains of very young hadrosaurs are actually somewhat common. Darren Tanke has observed that an experienced collector could actually discover multiple juvenile hadrosaur specimens in a single day. The most common remains of young hadrosaurs in the Dinosaur Park Formation are dentaries, bones from limbs and feet, as well as vertebral centra. The material showed little or none of the abrasion that would have resulted from transport, meaning the fossils were buried near their point of origin. Bonebeds 23, 28, 47, and 50 are productive sources of young hadrosaur remains in the formation, especially bonebed 50. The bones of juvenile hadrosaurs and fossil eggshell fragments are not known to have preserved in association with each other, despite both being present in the formation.

Pachycephalosaurs

Theropods 
In the Dinosaur Park Formation, small theropods are rare due to the tendency of their thin-walled bones to be broken or poorly preserved. Small bones of small theropods that were preyed upon by larger ones may have been swallowed whole and digested. In this context, the discovery of a small theropod dinosaur with preserved tooth marks was especially valuable. Possible indeterminate avimimid remains are known from the formation.

Ornithomimids

Oviraptorosaurs

Paravians 
A new taxon of troodontid based solely on teeth is known from the upper part of the formation.

Tyrannosaurs

Other reptiles

Choristoderes 
Choristoderes, or champsosaurs, were aquatic reptiles.  Small examples looked like lizards, while larger types were superficially similar to crocodilians. Remains of the following Choristoderes have been found in the formation:
 Champsosaurus (at least 3 species)
 Cteniogenys sp. cf. antiquus (possibly another genus)

Crocodylians 
Remains of the following Crocodylians have been found in the formation:
 Albertochampsa
 Leidyosuchus
 at least 1 unnamed taxon

Lizards 
Remains of the following lizards have been found in the formation:
 Helodermatids
 Labrodioctes
 Necrosaurids
 Parasaniwa
 Teiids
 Glyptogenys
 Socognathus
 Varanids
 Palaeosaniwa
 Xenosaurids
 ?Exostinus

Plesiosaurs 
Remains of the following Plesiosaurs have been found in the formation:
 Fluvionectes
 indeterminate polycotylids (shorter-necked)

Pterosaurs 
Remains of the following pterosaurs have been found in the formation:
 Cryodrakon  (known from small and large specimens)
1 unnamed non-azhdarchid pterosaur

Turtles 
Remains of the following turtles have been found in the formation:
 Adocus
 "Apalone"
 Aspideretoides (3 species)
 Basilemys
 Boremys
 Judithemys
 Neurankylus
 Plesiobaena
 2 indeterminate taxa

Mammals 
Remains of the following mammals have been found in the formation:

 Multituberculata
 Cimexomys sp.
 Cimolodon spp.
 Cimolomys clarki
 Meniscoessus major
 Mesodma primaeva
 unnamed multituberculates
 Metatherians
 Alphadon halleyi
 Eodelphis browni
 E. cutleri
 5 species of "Pediomys"
 Turgidodon russelli
 T. praesagus
 Eutherians
 Cimolestes sp. (uncertain taxonomy)
 Gypsonictops lewisi
 Paranyctoides sternbergi
 Unknown therians: at least 1 species

Fish 
Remains of the following fish have been found in the formation:

 Chondrichthyans
 Cretorectolobus olsoni (a carpet shark)
 Eucrossorhinus microcuspidatus (a carpet shark)
 Ischyrhiza mira (a sclerorhynchid)
 Meristodonoides montanensis (a shark)
 Myledaphus bipartitus (a ray)
 Protoplatyrhina renae (a guitarfish)
 indeterminate orectolobid
 Acipenseriformes (sturgeons)
 "Acipenser albertensis"
 Anchiacipenser acanthaspis
 unnamed sturgeon
 unnamed paddlefish
 Holostean fish
 Lepisosteus occidentalis (the gar)
 unnamed bowfin
 at least 2 other holosteans
 Teleost fish
 Belonostomus longirostris
 Cretophareodus (an osteoglossomorph)
 Coriops amnicolus
 Estesesox foxi
 Oldmanesox
 Paralbula (including Phyllodus)
 Paratarpon apogerontus (an elopomorph, like the tarpon)
 at least 8 other teleosts

Invertebrates 
Remains of the following invertebrates have been found in the formation:

 Freshwater bivalves
 Fusconaia
 Lampsilis
 Sphaerium (2 species)
 Freshwater gastropods
 Campeloma (2 species)
 Elimia
 Goniobasis (3 species)
 Hydrobia
 Lioplacodes (2 species)

Flora

Plant body fossils 
The following plant body fossils have been found in the formation:

 various ferns
 Equisetum (Equisetaceae)
 Gymnosperms
 Platyspiroxylon (Cupressaceae)
 Podocarpoxylon (Podocarpaceae)
 Elatocladus (Taxodiaceae)
 Sequoia (Taxodiaceae)
 Sequoiaxylon (Taxodiaceae)
 Taxodioxylon (Taxodiaceae)
 Ginkgos
 Baiera
 Ginkgoites
 Angiosperms
 Artocarpus (Moraceae)
 Cercidiphyllum (Cercidiphyllaceae)
 Dombeyopsis (Sterculiaceae)
 Menispermites (Menispermaceae)
 Pistia (Araceae)
 Platanus (Platanaceae)
 Vitis (Vitaceae)
 Trapa (Trapaceae)

Palynomorphs 
Palynomorphs are organic-walled microfossils, like spores, pollen, and algae. The following palynomorphs have been found in the formation:

 Unknown producers
 at least 8 species
 Fungi
 at least 35 taxa
 Chlorophyta (green algae and blue-green algae)
 at least 12 species
 Pyrrhophyta (dinoflagellates, a type of marine algae)
 unassigned cysts
 Bryophytes (mosses, liverworts, and hornworts)
 Anthocerotophyta (hornworts)
 at least 5 species
 Marchantiophyta (liverworts)
 at least 14 species
 Bryophyta (mosses)
 at least 5 species
 Lycopodiophyta
 Lycopodiaceae (club mosses)
 at least 11 species
 Selaginellaceae (small club mosses)
 at least 6 species
 Isoetaceae (quillworts)
 at least 1 species
 Polypodiophyta
 Osmundaceae (cinnamon ferns)
 at least 6 species
 Schizaeaceae (climbing ferns)
 at least 20 species
 Gleicheniaceae (Gleichenia and allies; coral ferns)
 at least 5 species
 Cyatheaceae (Cyathea and allies)
 at least 4 species
 Dicksoniaceae (Dicksonia and allies)
 at least 3 species
 Polypodiaceae (ferns)
 at least 4 species
 Matoniaceae
 at least 1 species
 Marsileaceae
 at least 1 species
 Pinophyta (gymnosperms)
 Cycadaceae (cycads)
 at least 3 species
 Caytoniaceae
 at least 1 species
 Pinaceae (pines)
 at least 4 species
 Cupressaceae (cypresses)
 at least 3 species
 Podocarpaceae (Podocarpus and allies)
 at least 4 species
 Cheirolepidiaceae
 at least 2 species
 Ephedraceae (Mormon teas)
 at least 6 species
 Unknown gymnosperms: at least 3 species
 Magnoliophyta (angiosperms)
 Magnoliopsida (dicots)
 Buxaceae (boxwood)
 at least 1 species
 Gunneraceae (gunneras)
 at least 1 species
 Salicaceae (willows, cottonwood, quaking aspen)
 at least 1 species
 Droseraceae (sundews)
 at least 1 species
 Olacaceae (tallowwood)
 at least 2 species
 Loranthaceae (showy mistletoes)
 at least 1 species
 Sapindaceae (soapberry)
 at least 1 species
 Aceraceae (maples)
 at least 1 species
 Proteaceae (proteas)
 at least 9 species
 Compositae (sunflowers)
 at least 1 species
 Fagaceae (beeches, oaks, chestnuts)
 at least 2 species
 Betulaceae (birches, alders)
 at least 1 species
 Ulmaceae (elms)
 at least 1 species
 Chenopodiaceae (goosefoots)
 at least 1 species
 Liliopsida (monocots)
 Liliaceae (lilies)
 at least 6 species
 Cyperaceae (sedges)
 at least 1 species
 Sparganiaceae (bur-reeds)
 possibly 1 species
 Unknown angiosperms: at least 88 species

Timeline of new taxa 
The following timeline displays valid taxa first discovered in the dinosaur park formation. Some species may have been referred to other genera subsequent to their initial description.

See also 
 List of dinosaur-bearing rock formations

Footnotes

References 
 
Braman, D.R., and Koppelhus, E.B. 2005. Campanian palynomorphs. In: Currie, P.J., and Koppelhus, E.B. (eds), Dinosaur Provincial Park: A Spectacular Ancient Ecosystem Revealed.  Indiana University Press: Bloomington and Indianapolis, 101–130.
Brinkman, D.B. 2005. Turtles: diversity, paleoecology, and distribution. In: Currie, P.J., and Koppelhus, E.B. (eds), Dinosaur Provincial Park: A Spectacular Ancient Ecosystem Revealed.  Indiana University Press: Bloomington and Indianapolis, 202–220.
Caldwell, M.W. The squamates: origins, phylogeny, and paleoecology. In: Currie, P.J., and Koppelhus, E.B. (eds). 2005. Dinosaur Provincial Park: A Spectacular Ancient Ecosystem Revealed.  Indiana University Press: Bloomington and Indianapolis, 235–248.
Currie, P.J. 2005. Theropods, including birds. In: Currie, P.J., and Koppelhus, E.B. (eds), Dinosaur Provincial Park: A Spectacular Ancient Ecosystem Revealed.  Indiana University Press: Bloomington and Indianapolis, 367–397.
Currie, P.J., and Koppelhus, E.B. (eds). 2005. Dinosaur Provincial Park: A Spectacular Ancient Ecosystem Revealed.  Indiana University Press: Bloomington and Indianapolis, 648 p.
Eberth, D.A. 2005. The geology. In: Currie, P.J., and Koppelhus, E.B. (eds), Dinosaur Provincial Park: A Spectacular Ancient Ecosystem Revealed.  Indiana University Press: Bloomington and Indianapolis, 54–82.
Fox, R.C. 2005. Late Cretaceous mammals. In: Currie, P.J., and Koppelhus, E.B. (eds), Dinosaur Provincial Park: A Spectacular Ancient Ecosystem Revealed.  Indiana University Press: Bloomington and Indianapolis, 417–435.
K. Gao and Brinkman, D.B. 2005. Choristoderes from the Park and its vicinity. In: Currie, P.J., and Koppelhus, E.B. (eds), Dinosaur Provincial Park: A Spectacular Ancient Ecosystem Revealed.  Indiana University Press: Bloomington and Indianapolis, 221–234.
Gardner, J.D. 2005. Lissamphibians. In: Currie, P.J., and Koppelhus, E.B. (eds), Dinosaur Provincial Park: A Spectacular Ancient Ecosystem Revealed.  Indiana University Press: Bloomington and Indianapolis, 186–201.
Godfrey, S.J., and Currie, P.J. 2005. Pterosaurs. In: Currie, P.J., and Koppelhus, E.B. (eds), Dinosaur Provincial Park: A Spectacular Ancient Ecosystem Revealed.  Indiana University Press: Bloomington and Indianapolis, 292–311.
Johnston, P.A., and Hendy, A.J.W. 2005. Paleoecology of mollusks from the Upper Cretaceous Belly River Group. In: Currie, P.J., and Koppelhus, E.B. (eds), Dinosaur Provincial Park: A Spectacular Ancient Ecosystem Revealed.  Indiana University Press: Bloomington and Indianapolis, 139–166.
Koppelhus, E.B. 2005. Paleobotany. In: Currie, P.J., and Koppelhus, E.B. (eds), Dinosaur Provincial Park: A Spectacular Ancient Ecosystem Revealed.  Indiana University Press: Bloomington and Indianapolis, 131–138.
 
Neuman, A.G., and Brinkman, D.B. 2005. Fishes of the fluvial beds. In: Currie, P.J., and Koppelhus, E.B. (eds), Dinosaur Provincial Park: A Spectacular Ancient Ecosystem Revealed.  Indiana University Press: Bloomington and Indianapolis, 167–185.
Ryan, M.J., and Evans, D.C. 2005. Ornithischian dinosaurs. In: Currie, P.J., and Koppelhus, E.B. (eds), Dinosaur Provincial Park: A Spectacular Ancient Ecosystem Revealed.  Indiana University Press: Bloomington and Indianapolis, 312–348.
Sato, T., Eberth, D.A., Nicholls, E.L., and Manabe, M. 2005. Plesiosaurian remains from non-marine to paralic sediments. In: Currie, P.J., and Koppelhus, E.B. (eds), Dinosaur Provincial Park: A Spectacular Ancient Ecosystem Revealed.  Indiana University Press: Bloomington and Indianapolis, 249–276.
 Tanke, D.H. and Brett-Surman, M.K. 2001. Evidence of Hatchling and Nestling-Size Hadrosaurs (Reptilia:Ornithischia) from Dinosaur Provincial Park (Dinosaur Park Formation: Campanian), Alberta, Canada. pp. 206–218. In: Mesozoic Vertebrate Life—New Research Inspired by the Paleontology of Philip J. Currie. Edited by D.H. Tanke and K. Carpenter. Indiana University Press: Bloomington. xviii + 577 pp.
Xiao-Chun Wu. 2005. Crocodylians. In: Currie, P.J., and Koppelhus, E.B. (eds), Dinosaur Provincial Park: A Spectacular Ancient Ecosystem Revealed.  Indiana University Press: Bloomington and Indianapolis, 277-291

Geologic formations of Alberta
Upper Cretaceous Series of North America
Cretaceous Alberta
Campanian Stage
Sandstone formations
Mudstone formations
Siltstone formations
Fluvial deposits
Ooliferous formations
Western Canadian Sedimentary Basin
Fossiliferous stratigraphic units of North America
Paleontology in Canada